The SP22 is a modular semi-automatic pistol manufactured by Walther Sportwaffen and distributed by Smith & Wesson. The SP22 is chambered in .22 LR (5.6 mm) and is designed for sport and competition shooting. It is manufactured with a composite receiver, aluminum housing, and all-steel internal components. Walther has four different models of the SP22: the SP22 M1, SP22 M2, SP22 M3 and SP22 M4, as well as multiple accessories for customizing.

Variants

SP22 M1
The basic version of the pistol is the SP22 M1. The M1 is equipped with a  standard barrel, adjustable steel sights, and a two-stage trigger complete with adjustable trigger stop.

SP22 M2
The M2 model features a longer,  barrel for increased velocity and accuracy.

SP22 M3
The M3 model features a  match-grade barrel along with an adjustable match trigger. It also has removable Picatinny-style rails on top of, and underneath the housing. The M3 also comes larger polymer grips, and a quick-release magazine catch.

SP22 M4
The M4 model retains the same standard features that are found on the M3, but includes a contoured adjustable wooden grip with hand support, and lacks the Picatinny-style rails.

See also
 Walther P22

References

External links

SP22
.22 LR pistols